The Critique of Practical Reason is the second of Immanuel Kant's three critiques, published in 1788.  It follows on from Kant's first critique, the Critique of Pure Reason and deals with his moral philosophy. While Kant had already published one significant work in moral philosophy, the Groundwork of the Metaphysic of Morals (1785), the Critique of Practical Reason was intended to both cover a wider scope and place his ethical views within the larger framework of his system of critical philosophy.

The second Critique exercised a decisive influence over the subsequent development of the field of ethics and moral philosophy, beginning with Johann Gottlieb Fichte's Doctrine of Science and becoming, during the 20th century, the principal reference point for deontological moral philosophy.

Preface and introduction
Kant sketches out here what is to follow. Most of these two chapters focus on comparing the situation of theoretical and of practical reason and therefore discusses how the Critique of Practical Reason compares to the Critique of Pure Reason.

The first Critique, "of Pure Reason", was a criticism of the pretensions of those who use pure theoretical reason, who claim to attain metaphysical truths beyond the ken of applied reasoning. The conclusion was that pure theoretical reason must be restrained, because it produces confused arguments when applied outside of its appropriate sphere. However, the Critique of Practical Reason is not a critique of pure practical reason, but rather a defense of it as being capable of grounding behavior superior to that grounded by desire-based practical reasoning. It is actually a critique, then, of the pretensions of applied practical reason. Pure practical reason must not be restrained, in fact, but cultivated.

Kant informs us that while the first Critique suggested that God, freedom, and immortality are unknowable, the second Critique will mitigate this claim. Freedom is indeed knowable because it is revealed by the moral law. God and immortality are also knowable, but practical reason now requires belief in these postulates of reason. Kant once again invites his dissatisfied critics to actually provide a proof of God's existence and shows that this is impossible because the various arguments (ontological, cosmological and teleological) for God's existence all depend essentially on the idea that existence is a predicate inherent to the concepts to which it is applied.

Kant insists that the Critique can stand alone from the earlier Groundwork of the Metaphysics of Morals, although it addresses some criticisms leveled at that work. This work will proceed at a higher level of abstraction.

While valid criticisms of the Groundwork are to be addressed, Kant dismisses many criticisms that he finds unhelpful. He suggests that many of the defects that reviewers have found in his arguments are in fact only in their brains, which are too lazy to grasp his ethical system as a whole. As to those who accuse him of writing incomprehensible jargon, he challenges them to find more suitable language for his ideas or to prove that they are really meaningless. He reassures the reader that the second Critique will be more accessible than the first.

Finally, the sketch of the second Critique is presented in the Introduction. It is modeled on the first Critique: the Analytic will investigate the operations of the faculty in question; the Dialectic will investigate how this faculty can be led astray; and the Doctrine of Method will discuss the questions of moral education.

Analytic: Chapter One
Practical reason is the faculty for determining the will, which operates by applying a general principle of action to one's particular situation. For Kant, a principle can be either a mere maxim if it is based on the agent's desires or a law if it applies universally. Any principle that presupposes a previous desire for some object in the agent always presupposes that the agent is the sort of person who would be interested in that particular object. Anything that an agent is interested in can only be contingent, however, and never necessary. Therefore, it cannot be a law.

To say, for example, that the law is to serve God means that the law is dependent on interest in God. This cannot be the basis for any universal moral law. To say that the law is to seek the greatest happiness of the greatest number or the greatest good, always presupposes some interest in the greatest happiness, the greatest number, the greatest good, and so on. Kant concludes that the source of the nomological character of the moral law must derive not from its content but from its form alone. The content of the universal moral law, the categorical imperative, must be nothing over and above the law's form, otherwise it will be dependent on the desires that the law's possessor has. The only law whose content consists in its form, according to Kant, is the statement: 

Kant then argues that a will which acts on the practical law is a will which is acting on the idea of the form of law, an idea of reason which has nothing to do with the senses. Hence the moral will is independent of the world of the senses, the world where it might be constrained by one's contingent desires. The will is therefore fundamentally free. The converse also applies: if the will is free, then it must be governed by a rule, but a rule whose content does not restrict the freedom of the will. The only appropriate rule is the rule whose content is equivalent to its form, the categorical imperative. To follow the practical law is to be autonomous, whereas to follow any of the other types of contingent laws (or hypothetical imperatives) is to be heteronomous and therefore unfree. The moral law expresses the positive content of freedom, while being free from influence expresses its negative content.

Furthermore, we are conscious of the operation of the moral law on us and it is through this consciousness that we are conscious of our freedom and not through any kind of special faculty. Though our actions are normally determined by the calculations of "self-love", we realize that we can ignore self-love's urgings when moral duty is at stake. Consciousness of the moral law is a priori and unanalysable.

Kant ends this chapter by discussing Hume's refutation of causation. Hume argued that we can never see one event cause another, but only the constant conjunction of events. Kant suggests that Hume was confusing the phenomenal and noumenal worlds. Since we are autonomous, Kant now claims that we can know something about the noumenal world, namely that we are in it and play a causal role in it. This knowledge, however, is only practical and not theoretical. Therefore, it does not affect our knowledge of the things in themselves. Metaphysical speculation on the noumenal world is avoided.

Analytic: Chapter Two
Kant points out that every motive has an intended effect on the world. When it is desire that is driving us, we first examine the possibilities that the world leaves open to us, selecting some effect at which we wish to aim. Acting on the practical moral law does not work in this way. The only possible object of the practical law is the Good, since the Good is always an appropriate object for the practical law.

It is necessary to avoid the danger of understanding the practical law simply as the law that tells us to pursue the good, and try to understand the Good as that at which the practical law aims. If we do not understand the good in terms of the practical law, then we need some other analysis by which to understand it. The only alternative is to mistakenly understand the Good as the pursuit of pleasure and evil as the production of pain to oneself.

This sort of confusion between the Good and pleasure
also arises when we confuse the concepts of good versus evil with the concepts of good versus bad. The good, when contrasted with the bad, is really just pleasure. But this is not the case with the good, in the sense of morally good. A morally good person may suffer from a painful disease (bad), but he does not therefore become a bad (evil) person. If a morally bad person is punished for his crimes, it may be bad (painful) for him, but good and just in the moral sense.

The error of all past philosophical investigations into morality is that they have attempted to define the moral in terms of the good rather than the other way around. In this way, they have all fallen victim to the same error of confusing pleasure with morality. If one desires the good, one will act to satisfy that desire, that is in order to produce pleasure.

The moral law, in Kant's view, is equivalent to the idea of freedom. Since the noumenal cannot be perceived, we can only know that something is morally right by intellectually considering whether a certain action that we wish to commit could be universally performed.  Kant calls the idea that we can know what is right or wrong only through abstract reflection moral rationalism. This is to be contrasted with two alternative, mistaken approaches to moral epistemology: moral empiricism, which takes moral good and evil to be something we can apprehend from the world and moral mysticism, which takes morality to be a matter of sensing some supernatural property, such as the approbation of God. Although both positions are mistaken and harmful, according to Kant, moral empiricism is much more so because it is equivalent to the theory that the morally right is nothing more than the pursuit of pleasure.

In this chapter, Kant makes his clearest and most explicit formulation of the position he adopts with respect to the question of the fundamental nature of morality. Kant's position is that moral goodness, which consists in following the rule of the categorical imperative, is more basic to ethics than good consequences, and that it is the right motivations—an obligation to duty—which is criterial for defining a person as good. Hence, Kant is a deontologist, in the terminology of contemporary philosophy, particularly that of analytic philosophy. He also takes a position on the important question of how we can distinguish what is right from what is wrong. Kant believes that we can never really be sure when we have witnessed a moral act, since the moral rightness of an act consists of its being caused in the right way from the noumenal world, which is by definition unknowable. Hence, he is a moral rationalist.

Dialectic: Chapter One
Pure reason, in both its theoretical and practical forms, faces a fundamental problem. Most things in the phenomenal realm of experience are conditional (i.e. they depend on something else) but pure reason always seeks for the unconditional. The problem is that the unconditional, according to Kant, is only to be found in the noumenal world. Pure reason, when it attempts to reach beyond its limits into the unconditional realm of the noumenon is bound to fail and the result is the creation of antinomies of reason.

Antinomies are conflicting statements both of which appear to be validated by reason. Kant exposed several such antinomies of speculative reason in the first Critique. In the second Critique, he finds an antinomy of pure practical reason whose resolution is necessary in order to further our knowledge.

In this case, the antinomy consists in the fact that the object of pure practical reason must be the highest good (Summum bonum). Good actions depend on the highest good to make them worthwhile. However, assuming the existence of a highest good leads to paradox and assuming the non-existence of a highest good also leads to paradox.

Dialectic: Chapter Two
Kant posits two different senses of "the highest good." On one sense, it refers to that which is always good and which is required for all other goods. This sense is equivalent to "dutifulness". In another sense, it refers to the best of good states, even if part of that state is only contingently good. In this latter sense, the highest good combines virtuousness with happiness.

The highest good is the object of pure practical reason, so we cannot use the latter unless we believe that the former is achievable. However, virtue obviously does not necessarily lead to happiness in this world and vice versa. To aim at one is not to aim at the other and it seems to be a matter of chance whether the rest of the world will fill in the gap by rewarding us for our virtuous behavior.

But Kant's solution is to point out that we do not only exist phenomenally but also noumenally. Though we may not be rewarded with happiness in the phenomenal world, we may still be rewarded in an afterlife which can be posited as existing in the noumenal world. Since it is pure practical reason, and not just the maxims of impure desire-based practical reason, which demands the existence of such an afterlife, immortality, union with God and so on, then these things must be necessary for the faculty of reason as a whole and therefore they command assent.

The highest good requires the highest level of virtue.  We can know by self-examination that such virtue does not exist in us now, nor is it likely to exist in the foreseeable future. In fact, the only way in which the fallible human will can become similar to the holy will is for it to take an eternity to achieve perfection. Therefore, we can postulate the existence of immortality. If we do not postulate it,  we will be led to either soften the demands of morality in order to make them achievable here and now or we will make the absurd demand on ourselves that we must achieve the holy will now.

The highest good also requires the highest level of happiness, in order to reward the highest level of virtue. We therefore need to postulate that there is an omniscient God who can order the world justly and reward us for our virtue.

Doctrine of method
In the first Critique, the Doctrine of Method plans out the scientific study of the principles of pure theoretical reason. Here, however, the Doctrine of Method will instead be a discussion of how the principles of practical reason can be brought to bear on real life. In other words, the Doctrine of Method in the second Critique is fundamentally concerned with moral education: the question of how we can make people live and act morally.

Kant has shown that truly moral behavior requires more than just the outward show of good behavior; it also requires the right inner motivations. The cynic or utilitarian might be doubtful as to whether it is truly possible for human beings to act out of an "obligation to duty." In his view, even if we could produce a simulacrum of a moral society, it would all be an enormous theater of hypocrisy, since everyone would inwardly, privately continue to pursue his or her own advantage. Moreover, this outward show of morality would not be stable, but dependent on its continuing to be to the advantage of each individual. Fortunately, Kant believes, such doubts are misguided.

Almost any time there is a social gathering of some sort, the conversation will include gossip and argumentation which entails moral judgments and evaluations about the rightness or wrongness of the actions of others. Even people who normally do not enjoy intricate arguments tend to reason acutely and with great attention to detail when they are caught about in the justification or condemnation of their next-door neighbors' behavior.

Moral education should exploit this natural human tendency for moral evaluation by presenting the students with historical examples of good and evil actions. Through debating and discussing the worth of these examples on a case-by-case basis, the students will be given the opportunity to experience for themselves the admiration we feel for moral goodness and the disapproval that we feel for moral evil.

However, it is necessary to select the right sorts of examples in order to demonstrate genuine moral goodness. And here, Kant says, we are liable to error in two ways. The first type of error consists in trying to attract students into being moral by providing them examples in which morality and self-love coincide. The second type of error consists in trying to emotionally arouse the students about morality by providing examples of extraordinary moral heroism, above what morality normally requires. The examples we choose should stress simple dutifulness.

The first of these methods, argues Kant, is destined to fail because students will not come to understand the unconditional nature of duty. The examples will also not be very inspiring. When we see extraordinary self-sacrifice in the name of following a principle we are inspired and moved. But when we see someone following a principle with hardly any sacrifice or cost to himself, we are not equally impressed.

The second method will also fail because it appeals to the emotions rather than to reason. It is only reason that can produce long-lasting change in a person's character. This method also leads students to associate morality with the impossible theatrics of melodrama, and therefore to disdain the everyday obligations they should be fulfilling as boring and useless.

Kant ends the second Critique on a hopeful note about the future of ethics. The wonders of both the physical and the ethical worlds are not far for us to find: to feel awe, we should only look upward to the stars or inward to the moral law which we carry around within us. The study of the physical world was dormant for centuries and wrapped in superstition before the physical sciences actually came into existence. We are allowed to hope that soon the moral sciences will replace superstition with knowledge about ethics.

Referencing
The A numbers used as standard references refer to the page numbers of the original (1788) German edition.

References

External links

 Critique of Practical Reason at the Encyclopædia Britannica
 
  Immanuel Kant in Italia resources about the Critique of Practical Reason
 
 Bergande, W.: "Kant's Apathology of Compassion", in: L. Schreel (Ed.): Pathology and Aesthetics, Duesseldorf: Duesseldorf University Press, 2016

1788 non-fiction books
Books by Immanuel Kant
Ethics books
German non-fiction books
Philosophy books